The Lansing City Market was an urban city market located in downtown Lansing, Michigan. The market is located along the Grand River (Michigan) and Lansing River Trail, and is west of Cooley Law School Stadium. The current $1.6 million structure opened in January 2010.

History
The original Lansing City Market opened in 1909 at an adjacent site north of the current city market.  The building was demolished in April 2010 to allow room for a new mixed-use development.

An episode of Food Network's Food Court Wars was taped at the City Market on March 19, 2014.

Lansing City Market closed in October of 2019.

References

External links

Buildings and structures in Lansing, Michigan
Retail markets in the United States
Tourist attractions in Lansing, Michigan
Commercial buildings completed in 2010
2010 establishments in Michigan
Michigan State Historic Sites in Ingham County